The 2023 Houston Christian Huskies baseball team represents Houston Christian University, during the 2023 NCAA Division I baseball season. The Huskies play their home games at Husky Field and are led by second–year head coach Lance Berkman, former star player with the Houston Astros. They are members of the Southland Conference.

Preseason

Southland Conference Coaches Poll
The Southland Conference Coaches Poll was released on February 3, 2023. Houston Christian was picked to finish eighth in the Southland Conference with 41 votes.

Preseason All-Southland team
No Houston Christian players were named to a conference preseason team.

First Team
Edgar Alvarez (NICH, JR, 1st Base)
Brad Burckel  (MCNS, SR, 2nd Base)
Josh Leslie (MCNS, SR, 3rd Base)
Parker Coddou (NICH, JR, Shortstop)
Bo Willis (NWST, JR, Catcher)
Tre Jones (TAMUCC, JR, Designated Hitter)
Payton Harden (MCNS, SR, Outfielder)
Brendan Ryan (TAMUCC, SR, Outfielder)
Xane Washington (NICH, R-SR, Outfielder)
Zach Garcia  (TAMUCC, SO, Starting Pitcher)
Grant Rogers (MCNS, JR, Starting Pitcher)
Tyler Theriot (NICH, SR, Starting Pitcher)
Burrell Jones (MCNS, SR, Relief Pitcher)
Alec Carr (UIW, SR, Utility)

Second Team
Josh Blankenship (LU, SR, 1st Base)
Daunte Stuart (NWST, JR, 2nd Base)
Kasten Furr (NO, JR, 3rd Base)
Tyler Bischke (NO, JR, Shortstop)
Bryce Grizzaffi (SELA, SR, Catcher)
Kade Hunter (MCNS, SR, Designated Hitter)
Josh Caraway (TAMUCC, JR, Outfielder)
Braden Duhon (MCNS, JR, Outfielder)
Issac Williams (NO, JR, Outfielder)
Cal Carver  (NWST, SR, Starting Pitcher)
Tyler LeBlanc (NO, JR, Starting Pitcher)
Will Kinzeler (SELA, JR, Starting Pitcher)
Dalton Aspholm (SELA, SR, Relief Pitcher)
Tre’ Obregon III (MCNS, SR, Utility)

Schedule and results

References

Houston Christian Huskies
Houston Christian Huskies baseball seasons
Houston Christian Huskies baseball